Dato' Wira Othman bin Aziz (born 15 May 1959) is a Malaysian politician. He was the member of the Parliament of Malaysia for the seat of Jerlun, Kedah, from 5 May 2013 to 10 May 2018. He previously served one term in the Kedah State Legislative Assembly from 21 March 2004 to 8 March 2008) and was the chairman of the Kedah Tourism Action Council. He is a member of the United Malays National Organisation (UMNO) in the previous ruling Barisan Nasional (BN) coalition.

Background
Othman was born in Alor Setar, Kedah. He received his primary education at the Sekolah Kebangsaan Ayer Hitam, Kedah. He continued his secondary education in Kolej Sultan Abdul Hamid and later went to University Technology MARA to study a Diploma in Business Administration. After completing his diploma he went to the National University of Malaysia and graduated with Bachelor of Marketing Studies. He subsequently held a number of positions in corporate enterprises.

Political career
In the 2004 general election, Othman was elected to the state assembly of Kedah, defeating the incumbent Pan-Malaysian Islamic Party (PAS) assemblyman Abdul Ghani Ahmad by 860 votes in the seat of Ayer Hitam. In 2005 he was appointed to the Executive Council of the Kedah state government by the incoming Chief Minister Mahdzir Khalid. During this time he also managed the Kedah Football Association. He was a casualty of the Barisan Nasional state government's defeat in the 2008 election, as he lost his seat by 506 votes to his predecessor, Abdul Ghani.

In the 2013 election, Othman ran for the UMNO-held federal seat of Jerlun. Jerlun was being vacated by Mukhriz Mahathir, who was seeking to move to state politics to become Kedah's Chief Minister. Othman defeated Pan-Malaysian Islamic Party (PAS)'s Ismail Salleh by 3,270 votes, winning election to the federal parliament.

In the 2018 election, Othman lost to Mukhriz Mahathir, who was back contesting but under the Malaysian United Indigenous Party (PPBM) ticket, in a three-corner fight with Abdul Ghani Ahmad of PAS for the Jerlun parliamentary seat.

Honours 
He has been awarded :
 :
  Knight Commander of the Glorious Order of the Crown of Kedah (DGMK) - Dato' Wira (2017)

Election results

References

Living people
National University of Malaysia alumni
People from Kedah
1959 births
Malaysian people of Malay descent
Malaysian Muslims
United Malays National Organisation politicians
Members of the Dewan Rakyat
Members of the Kedah State Legislative Assembly
Kedah state executive councillors